Urakayevo (Uraqay) is a rural locality (a village) in Ibrayevsky Selsoviet, Kugarchinsky District, Bashkortostan, Russia. The population was 91 as of 2010. There are 3 streets.

Geography 
Urakayevo is located 17 km west of Mrakovo (the district's administrative centre) by road. Irtyubyak is the nearest rural locality.

References 

Rural localities in Kugarchinsky District